Vietnam competed in the 1997 Southeast Asian Games held in Jakarta, Indonesia from 11 to 19 December 1997.

References

1997 in Vietnamese sport
1997
Nations at the 1997 Southeast Asian Games